Scopula subserena is a moth of the family Geometridae. It is found in Saudi Arabia.

References

Moths described in 1990
subserena
Moths of Asia